An axon is part of a neuron.

Axon may also refer to:

Corporations:
 Axon (company), American public safety technology company
 Axon Automotive, British car manufacturer
 HCL Axon, British management consultants
 Axon Labs, American health & wellness consumer product manufacturer

Other:
 Axon (surname)
 The Axons, an alien race from the Doctor Who adventure The Claws of Axos
 Peter Axon, a character in the series Psi Factor

See also
 Axone (disambiguation)
 Axion (disambiguation)